Black Entertainment Television (acronym BET) is an American basic cable channel targeting African-American audiences. It is owned by the CBS Entertainment Group unit of Paramount Global via BET Networks and has offices in New York City, Los Angeles, Chicago, and was formerly headquartered in Washington, D.C.

As of February 2015, approximately 88,255,000 American households (75.8% of households with television) receive the channel.

History 

After stepping down as a lobbyist for the cable industry, Freeport, Illinois native Robert L. Johnson decided to launch his own cable television network. Johnson would soon acquire a loan for $15,000 and a $500,000 investment from media executive John Malone to start the network. The network, which was named Black Entertainment Television (BET), launched on January 25, 1980. Cheryl D. Miller designed the logo that would represent the network, which featured a star to symbolize "Black Star Power".

Initially, broadcasting for two hours a week as a block of programming on the Madison Square Garden Sports Network (which would change their name to USA Network three months after BET launched), the network's lineup composed of music videos and reruns of popular black sitcoms.

It would not be until 1983 that BET became a full-fledged entity, independent of any other channel or programming block, though for years it continued to share channel space with other cable networks on local cable systems due to lack of channel room for their 24-hour schedule until the time of digital cable allowed for larger channel capacity. In some markets, the network would not arrive at all until as late as the early 2010s and ViacomCBS considered it compulsory in retransmission consent negotiations to carry the BET Networks with ViacomCBS networks, due to some providers claiming that there was an overall lack of demand for the channel, or there was a low to non-existent African-American population within their service area.

BET launched a news program, BET News, in 1988, with Ed Gordon as its anchor. Gordon later hosted other programs and specials on BET, such as Black Men Speak Out: The Aftermath, related to the 1992 Los Angeles riots, and a recurring interview show, Conversations with Ed Gordon. In 1996, the talk show BET Tonight started with Tavis Smiley as host; in 2001, Ed Gordon replaced Smiley as host of the program.

In 1991, the network became the first black-controlled television company to be listed on the New York Stock Exchange. Starting the late 1990s, the network expanded with the launch of digital cable networks: what is now the general interest channel BET Her was initially launched as "BET on Jazz" (later known as "BET Jazz", "BET J", and "Centric"), created initially to showcase jazz music-related programming, especially that of African-American jazz musicians; in 1997, it entered into a joint venture with Starz (then-owned by John Malone's Liberty Media, but later acquired by Lionsgate years later) to launch a multiplex service of the premium channel featuring African American-oriented films called "BET Movies: Starz! 3" (later renamed "Black Starz" after BET dropped out of the venture following its purchase by Viacom, then-owner of Starz rival Showtime, and now known as "Starz InBlack"). In 2001, the network lost its status as a black-owned business when it was bought by media conglomerate Viacom for $3 billion. In 2005, Johnson retired from the network, turning over his titles of president and chief executive officer to former BET vice president Debra L. Lee.

In 2002, the network had launched two more music-oriented networks, BET Hip-Hop and BET Gospel. BET also launched a series of original programming by this time, including reality shows Baldwin Hills and Hell Date, competition show Sunday Best, and town hall-style discussion show Hip Hop vs. America. BET's president of entertainment Reginald Hudlin resigned from the network on September 11, 2008. He was then replaced by Stephen Hill, who is also executive vice president of music programming and talent. BET announced in March 2010 that Ed Gordon would return to the network to host "a variety of news programs and specials".

In March 2017, president of programming Stephen Hill and executive vice president of original programming Zola Mashariki both stepped down. Connie Orlando, senior vice president of Specials, Music Programming, and News was named the interim president of programming.

In July 2017, Viacom signed new film and television development deals with Tyler Perry following the expiration of his existing pact with Discovery Inc. (now merged with WarnerMedia) in 2019. As part of this deal, Perry would produce The Oval and Sistas for BET and co-own the network's newly launched streaming service, BET+.

In March 2023, it was reported that Paramount Global was exploring the sale of a majority stake in BET Networks in order to provide additional funding to its flagship streaming service Paramount+; Perry, as well as Byron Allen (who owns Entertainment Studios, TheGrio, and The Weather Channel), were identified as potential suitors.

Programming

BET's programming began with a wide range of comedy, news and current affairs, public affairs, and music programming, including mainstream rap, hip-hop and R&B music videos (which now air on its branded sister networks) and the network's former flagship program, 106 & Park (which premiered on September 11, 2000, and ended on December 19, 2014). In addition, BET has previously aired same-day or week-delayed late-night runs of syndicated talk shows.

Original programming currently seen on BET include Boomerang, Games People Play and The Oval. Daily programming on the network composes of acquired television series and both theatrically and direct-to-video-released films. The network's morning BET Rejoice block (formerly BET Inspiration until 2017) is dedicated to religious programming and airs in lieu of infomercials in late-night, which the network has not aired since 1997; BET is one of a batch of subscription channels and one of only two Paramount-owned networks to have discontinued airing infomercials (sister network Nickelodeon (through its Nick at Nite block) ran infomercials in some overnight timeslots from 1987 to 1998, with series airing in that daypart since then).

BET also carries and produces several award ceremonies, including the network's own BET Awards, which were established in 2001 to celebrate African-Americans and diverse minorities in music, acting, sports and other parts of entertainment over the past year. Formerly, the BET Honors, which were established in 2008 to honor the lives and achievements of African-American figures and are presented during Black History Month each February. The BET Awards is the network's flagship event, with the "BET Experience" festival held in the days leading up to the telecast.

Other services

BET Walk of Fame Awards 
The BET Walk of Fame Awards were established in 1995 by BET. In 2004, proceeds were shared between United Negro College Fund (UNCF) and the BET Foundation, which executes the Healthy BET obesity awareness campaign and other pro-social causes like the annual charitable black-tie BET Walk of Fame ceremony.

BET Interactive 
In 2006, BET Interactive, LLC became a subsidiary of BET. BET also has a digital group including BET.com, BET on Blast, BET on Demand and BET Mobile.

BET Films

Released films

BET Home Entertainment 
BET's programming is distributed on DVD and through video-on-demand services under the name BET Home Entertainment. In 2007, a distribution deal was arranged with Paramount Home Entertainment, a sister company of BET since 2001.

Criticism 
A wide range of people have protested elements of BET's programming and actions, including Public Enemy rapper Chuck D, journalist George Curry, writer Keith Boykin, comic book creator Christopher Priest, filmmaker Spike Lee, Syracuse University professor of finance Dr. Boyce Watkins, former NFL player Burgess Owens, and cartoonist Aaron McGruder (who, in addition to numerous critical references throughout his series, The Boondocks, made two particular episodes, "The Hunger Strike" and "The Uncle Ruckus Reality Show", criticizing the channel). As a result, BET heavily censors suggestive content from the videos that it airs, often with entire verses and scenes removed from certain rap videos.

Many scholars within the African-American community maintain that BET perpetuates and justifies racism by affecting the stereotypes held about African-Americans, and also by affecting the psyche of its young viewers through its bombardment of negative images of African-Americans.

Following the death of civil rights leader Coretta Scott King in 2006, BET broadcast its regularly scheduled music video programming, rather than covering King's funeral live, as was done by TV One and Black Family Channel, and by cable news channels such as CNN, Fox News Channel, and MSNBC. The network's website streamed the funeral live, while it periodically broadcast taped, 60-second reports from the funeral by senior news correspondent Andre Showell. Michael Lewellen, BET's senior vice president for corporate communications, defended the decision: "We weighed a number of different options. In the end, we chose to offer a different kind of experience for BET viewers." Lewellen also explained that BET received around "two dozen" phone calls and "a handful" of emails criticizing BET for not showing the King funeral live. On the evening of the funeral, February 7, 2006, BET broadcast the tribute special Coretta Scott King: Married to the Mission, and repeated it the following Sunday, February 12. Showell hosted the program featuring highlights of the funeral, Coretta Scott King: Celebrating Her Spirit, that broadcast that same day. In its 2007 convention, the National Association of Black Journalists gave BET its "Thumbs Down Award" for not broadcasting King's funeral live.

The New York Times reported that the Reverend Delman L. Coates and his organization Enough is Enough led protests every weekend outside the residences of BET executives against what they claim are negative stereotypes of black people perpetuated by BET music videos. Enough is Enough backed an April 2008 report titled The Rap on Rap by the Parents Television Council that criticized BET's rap programming, suggesting that the gratuitous sexual, violent and profane content was targeting children and teens.

In a 2010 interview, BET co-founder Sheila Johnson explained that she herself is "ashamed" of what the network has become. "I don't watch it. I suggest to my kids that they don't watch it," she said. "When we started BET, it was going to be the Ebony magazine on television. We had public affairs programming. We had news... I had a show called Teen Summit, we had a large variety of programming, but the problem is that then the video revolution started up... And then something started happening, and I didn't like it at all. And I remember during those days we would sit up and watch these videos and decide which ones were going on and which ones were not. We got a lot of backlash from recording artists...and we had to start showing them. I didn't like the way women were being portrayed in these videos."

Sister networks & International

Spin-offs 
BET has launched several spin-off networks over the years, including BET Her (formerly known as "BET on Jazz", then "BET J" and later "Centric"), BET Jams (formerly known as "MTV Jams"), and BET Soul (formerly known as "VH1 Soul"), alongside SHO×BET, a premium Showtime multiplex network.

In May 2019, a BET-branded channel was launched on Pluto TV, which was owned by ViacomCBS in March 2019. In June 2019, ViacomCBS announced the launch of BET+, a premium streaming service targeting the network's African-American demographic. The service launched in the United States in Fall 2019 with First Wives Club (which was originally planned to launch on Paramount Network before being shifted to BET) announced as one of the service's original series.

BET Gospel 

BET Gospel is a television network in the United States that launched on July 1, 2002, and provides gospel and religious programming. The network, a spin-off of BET (Black Entertainment Television), mixes new and classic shows as well as original gospel-oriented programming. BET Gospel previously ran on an automated loop schedule. In 2016, the channel was updated with its programming now composing of recent uplifting music videos, as well as gospel-themed series and specials.

Current programming 
 Lifted (2016–present) (music videos)
 Being (2016–present)
 Bobby Jones Gospel (2002–present)
 Lift Every Voice (2002–present)
 Celebration of Gospel 
 It's a Mann's World (2016–present)
 Let the Church Say Amen (2016–present)
 The Sheards (2016–present)
 T.D. Jakes Presents: Mind, Body, & Soul (2016–present)
 Sunday Best (2016–present)

Former programming 
 Video Gospel (2002–2016)
 The Potters House (2002–2016)
 T.D. Jakes 
 Bernard E. Jordan (2002–2016)
 M.B. Jefferson (2002–2016)
 Prophet Manasseh Jordan (2002–2016)

BET Hip-Hop 

BET Hip-Hop is a music video network owned by BET Networks which is exclusive to digital cable systems. It formerly aired some of BET's original programming such as Rap City, ComicView and the network's video countdown programs. After the 2015 relaunch of the former MTV Jams as BET Jams (which has much wider distribution), the channel's programming was shifted to an automated playlist made up of BET's library of older hip-hop videos. As part of Viacom's 2017 restructuring plan, the network was speculated to slowly wind down operations over time.

BET International 

BET UK first transmitted on Videotron (now known as Virgin Media) and several other subscription providers from 1993 until 1996.

In May 2007 by Ofcom, BET International Inc. was given a license to rebroadcast in the United Kingdom. BET International is the first international version of the channel and is available in Europe, Africa and the Middle East through satellite providers. BET launched on February 27, 2008, on Sky channel 191 and began to be carried by Freesat channel 140 on August 8, 2008. BET+1 is also available on Sky channel 198 and Freesat channel 141, and is free-to-air. BET International shows with a mix of content from the main BET channel and locally produced shows. An exclusive, but temporary, HD version of the channel was made to show the 2009 BET Awards on Freesat EPG 142.

BET is additionally an associate member of the Caribbean Cable Cooperative.

BET launched an app called BET Play allowing international access to BET content in over 100 countries in June 2016.

The channel was shut down on April 8, 2021, with its content moved to My5 and Pluto TV.

Canada 
BET became available in Canada in October 1997 on most pay television providers. The Canadian feed mirrors the U.S. feed, though certain television programs and films are blacked out. Until 2017, they were replaced with repeats of old music video blocks (namely BET Music, The Pull Up and BET Now). As of May 2018, the feed now airs current music videos and other acquired sitcoms and films in place of blacked-out programs.

France 

Introduced on November 17, 2015. BET France launched across a linear television channel alongside non-linear services including Bouygues Telecom, Canalsat, Numericable/SFR, and Free.

See also 

 Scott Mills
 BET Hip Hop Awards
 List of programs broadcast by BET
 New Urban Entertainment
 Rip the Runway

References

Further reading

External links 
 Official website
 
 "Black Entertainment Television" Interview with Robert Johnson, founder and president of BET, from KUT's In Black America series on the American Archive of Public Broadcasting, April 29, 1986

1980 establishments in Washington, D.C.
African-American television
BET Networks
BET+
2001 mergers and acquisitions
English-language television stations in the United States
Music video networks in the United States
Mass media companies based in Washington, D.C.
Television channels and stations established in 1983
Television networks in the United States
African-American television networks